The Diocese of Eastern Pennsylvania is a diocese of the Orthodox Church in America (OCA). Its territory includes parishes, monasteries, and missions located in two states in the United States – Delaware and Pennsylvania. The diocesan chancery is located in South Canaan Township, Pennsylvania.

Bishops 
 Adam (Filippovskiy) (1935-1944)
 Nikon (de Greve) (September 19, 1947 - May 7, 1952)
 Demetrius (Magan) (c. 1953-1964)
 Cyprian (Borisevich) (1964 - 14 December 1980)
 Herman (Swaiko) (March 17, 1981 - July 22, 2002)
 Tikhon (Mollard) (February 14, 2004 - November 13, 2012)
 Melchisedek (Pleska) (13 November 2012 - 18 March 2014) locum tenens
 Mark (Maymon) (since March 18, 2014)

Deaneries 
The diocese is grouped geographically into three deaneries, each consisting of a number of parishes. Each deanery is headed by a parish priest, known as a dean. The deans coordinate activities in their area's parishes, and report to the diocesan bishop.  The current deaneries of the Diocese of Eastern Pennsylvania are:

 Frackville Deanery – Pennsylvania
 Philadelphia Deanery – Delaware and Pennsylvania
 Wilkes-Barre Deanery – Pennsylvania

Diocesan Departments 
The diocese has several active departments, including 
 the Missions department
 the Office of Church School Education and Curriculum
 the Office of Young Adult Activities
 the Liturgical Life Committee, and the Office of Vocations.

A Diocesan Revitalization committee has also been created for the purpose of revitalizing all parishes within the diocese, to foster spiritual growth and address the various challenges facing the Diocese today.

External links 
 Official site
 Official Diocesan Youth Department site
 Official Diocesan Summer Camp site

Eastern Pennsylvania
Christianity in Delaware
Eastern Orthodoxy in Pennsylvania